Chaghar Bolagh (also Romanized as Chāghar Bolāgh; also known as Chalākh, Chaqar Bolāgh, and Chaulākh) is a village in Panjeh Ali-ye Jonubi Rural District, in the Central District of Qorveh County, Kurdistan Province, Iran. At the 2006 census, its population was 497, in 110 families. The village is populated by Kurds.

References 

Towns and villages in Qorveh County
Kurdish settlements in Kurdistan Province